Mimocalothyrza is a genus of longhorn beetles of the subfamily Lamiinae, containing the following species:

 Mimocalothyrza bottegoi (Gestro, 1895)
 Mimocalothyrza speyeri (Hintz, 1919)

References

Phrynetini